Dixie College may refer to:

 Dixie Technical College, St. George, Utah, U.S. 
 Dixie University, Dallas, Texas, U.S. (1933-1935) 
 Tennessee Tech, Cookeville, Tennessee, U.S. officially known as "Dixie University" from 1909–1915, but popularly called "Dixie College."
 Utah Tech University the new name (July 2022) of "Dixie State University" (2013-2022), St. George, Utah, U.S.(Similarly known as Dixie Academy (1913) Dixie Normal College (1916), Dixie Junior College (1923), "Dixie College"(1970), and Dixie State College(2000.))